The S&P Vietnam 10 Index is a stock market index from Standard & Poor's. The index was launched on September 19, 2008.

Components at launch

References

Vietnamese stock market indices